The 1783 New York gubernatorial election was held in April/May 1783 to elect the Governor and the Lieutenant Governor of New York.

Candidates
The incumbent George Clinton ran for re-election. New York State Surveyor General Philip Schuyler and state senator Ephraim Paine also ran for Governor.

Incumbent Pierre Van Cortlandt was the only candidate for Lieutenant Governor.

Results
The incumbents Clinton and Van Cortlandt were elected.

See also
New York gubernatorial elections
New York state elections

1783
United States gubernatorial elections in the 1780s
Gubernatorial